The Journal of Arabic and Islamic Studies, often abbreviated to JAIS, is an international, peer-reviewed academic journal. It was founded in 1995 by Joseph N. Bell from the University of Bergen, Norway, and Petr Zemánek from Charles University in Prague. The current editors are Lutz Edzard and Stephan Guth, both of Oslo University.

The journal is open access. Its stated aims are to promote the study of history, language, literature and culture through the publication of research articles. The journal receives in excess of 250,000 visits per annum, making it the world's most widely read journal in the field of Arabic, Islamic and Middle Eastern Studies.

Volumes from 1995 to 2002 were published on paper by Edinburgh University Press. The journal is now published electronically on its primary site hosted by the Department of Culture Studies and Oriental Languages (IKOS), Oslo University.

Editorial board
Its editorial board are: Aziz al-Azmeh, Frédéric Bauden, Michael G. Carter, Kinga Dévényi, Lutz E. Edzard, Antonella Ghersetti, Stephan Guth, Jaakko Hämeen-Anttila, Carole Hillenbrand, Jacob Høigilt, David A. King, Pierre Larcher, Stefan Leder, Wilferd Madelung, Juan Quesada Martos, Alex Metcalfe, James E. Montgomery, Ute Pietruschka, Paul G. Starkey, John O. Voll, and Petr Zemánek.

Abstracting and indexing
The journal is abstracted and indexed in:
 ATLA Religion Database
 IBZ Online
 Index Islamicus
 Linguistic Bibliography
 Modern Language Association Database

References

External links

1905 establishments in Scotland
Arab culture
Arab studies
Edinburgh University Press academic journals
Islamic studies journals
Lancaster University
Middle Eastern studies journals
Open access journals
Publications established in 1995
University of Oslo